The 2022–23 season is the 99th season in the existence of RC Celta de Vigo and the club's 11th consecutive season in the top flight of Spanish football. In addition to the domestic league, Celta Vigo participated in this season's edition of the Copa del Rey.

Players

First-team squad

Reserve team

Out on loan

Transfers

In

Out

Pre-season and friendlies

Competitions

Overall record

La Liga

League table

Results summary

Results by round

Matches 
The league fixtures were announced on 23 June 2022.

Copa del Rey

References 

RC Celta de Vigo seasons
Celta Vigo